Princess Fathia (17 December 1930 – 10 December 1976) was the youngest daughter of Fuad I of Egypt and Nazli Sabri, and the youngest sister of Farouk I.

Early life
Fathia was born on 17 December 1930 at the Koubbeh Palace, El-Quba, Cairo. Her father, Fuad I died when she was five years old. She was raised mostly close to her mother and her sister Faika. In 1948, she travelled with her sister Faika and her mother to the United States for her mother needed to undergo a kidney surgery.

Later life
After her mother's successful surgery, Fathia settled in the United States. In 1949, her sister Faika married Fuad Sadek.  In 1950, she herself married Riyad Ghali, their Royal Advisor, who was 11 years her senior, and was a Coptic Christian. Ghali converted to Islam to try and gain favor with King Farouk during the wedding She married at the Fairmont Hotel in San Francisco, California, United States on 25 April 1950 in a civil ceremony and 24 May 1950 in a Muslim ceremony by a Imam King Farouk was shocked and humiliated by the scandal and sacrilege: in effect,  he excommunicated both women, confiscating their extensive lands and banning them from Egypt forever. Faika went back to Egypt in 1951 to get back her title, and she did, and her husband Fuad Sadek got the "Bekdom" or held the title "Fuad Bek Sadek". Fathia and her mother settled in the United States for the rest of her life, having money troubles that eventually led to living in a small flat in California. Later in 1973, she divorced Riyad Ghali because of bad investments that made them lose almost everything they owned. Later, her mother's jewelry was sold for $1,500,000. Fathia also worked as a cleaning lady to pay her debt.

Some time later, her mother sent a request to President Anwar El-Sadat to retrieve their Egyptian passports, which he granted. However, a few days before returning to Egypt, Fathia was killed.

Death
An unconfirmed story by an Egyptian journalist states that on 10 December 1976, the day she was returning to Egypt, she went to her ex-husband's house with the excuse of "taking Ghali's mother's (Galila) clothes, where she found Ghali drunk. Not wanting her to leave, he shot her in the head 6 times with his revolver before attempting to take his own life. Ghali survived and was promptly investigated. Some reports say he only served a year in prison, due to poor health. He died in 1987.

Issue
Fathia and Riad Ghali had three children, two sons and a daughter:
 Rafik (born 29 November 1952)
 Rayed (born 20 May 1954)
 Ranya (born 21 April 1956)

Titles
 Her Royal Highness, Princess Fathia Fuad of Egypt (1930–1950).
 Mrs. Fathia Ghali (1950–1973).
 Miss Fathia Fuad (1973–1976).

Honours
  Decoration of Al Kemal in brilliants.

Ancestry

See also
 Anwar Al-Sadat
 Farouk I
 Fuad I
 Kingdom of Egypt
 Muhammad Ali Dynasty
 Muhammad Ali Pasha 
 Nazli Sabri

References

20th-century Egyptian women
People from Cairo
1930 births
1976 deaths
Egyptian Christians
Converts to Roman Catholicism from Islam
Daughters of kings
Deaths by firearm in California
Egyptian emigrants to the United States
Egyptian former Muslims
Egyptian people of Albanian descent
Egyptian Roman Catholics
Egyptian royalty
Muhammad Ali dynasty
Murdered royalty
Violence against women in the United States